Madeleine Zimmermann is a retired Swiss slalom canoeist who competed from the early 1950s to the late 1960s. She won a bronze medal in the folding K-1 team event at the 1951 ICF Canoe Slalom World Championships in Steyr.

References

Swiss female canoeists
Living people
Year of birth missing (living people)
Medalists at the ICF Canoe Slalom World Championships